"I've Got the Key to the Kingdom" is a gospel blues song recorded in 1929 by Washington Phillips (18801954, vocals and zither).

The song consists of several verses and a refrain:

The verses relate to the Biblical story of Daniel in the lions' den, and his deliverance from it; found in the Book of Daniel at Chapter 6.

Phillips' song may be a variant of a traditional gospel song. "Key to the Kingdom" by Bessie Johnson and the Sanctified Singers (1929, 10" 78rpm single Okeh 8725) consists almost entirely of a similar refrain.
"Got a Key to the Kingdom" by Josh White (1935, 10" 78rpm single Melotone 5-11-60 and simultaneous releases) has the same tune and a similar refrain, but very different verses.

Recordings 
 1929Washington Phillips
 1929Blind Willie Davis (song titled as "I've Got a Key to the Kingdom") on Paramount Records

See also 
 Keys of the Kingdom (disambiguation)

References 

Blues songs
Gospel songs
Washington Phillips songs
1929 songs
Columbia Records singles